California National Bank was a consumer and business bank in the Southern California area.

Overview
Cal National Bank originally began in 1996 when FBOP Corporation acquired Torrance Bank. Two years later, FBOP acquired five branches of Topa Savings and Topa Thrift, establishing California National Bank.

As Cal National started growing, it acquired People’s Bank of California in 2001 and Fidelity Federal Bank in 2002.

By 2009, Cal National had grown to 68 branches throughout Southern California.

Bank failure
On Friday, October 30, 2009, California National Bank was closed by the Office of the Comptroller of the Currency, and the Federal Deposit Insurance Corporation (FDIC) was named Receiver.  All deposits and branches were transferred to U.S. Bank.

Because of the subprime mortgage crisis, Cal National suffered massive losses on $855 million worth of securities issued by Fannie Mae and Freddie Mac -- becoming a primary cause of Cal National's failure.

See also

 List of largest U.S. bank failures

References

External links
 

Banks based in California
Defunct companies based in Greater Los Angeles
Banks established in 1996
Bank failures in the United States
Banks disestablished in 2009
U.S. Bancorp
Defunct banks of the United States